Lambertianin D is an ellagitannin found in  Rubus lambertianus.

It is tetramer of casuarictin linked by sanguisorbic acid ester groups between glucopyranose moieties.

References 

Ellagitannins
Natural phenol tetramers